The 1987 NCAA Division I Indoor Track and Field Championships were contested March 13−14, 1987 at the Myriad Convention Center in Oklahoma City, Oklahoma to determine the individual and team national champions of men's and women's NCAA collegiate indoor track and field events in the United States. These were the 23nd annual men's championships and the 5th annual women's championships.

Three-time defending champions Arkansas claimed the men's team title, the Razorbacks' fourth overall title and, ultimately, the third of twelve straight titles for Arkansas. LSU, meanwhile, claimed their first women's team title, topping the team standings by five points.

Qualification
All teams and athletes from Division I indoor track and field programs were eligible to compete for this year's individual and team titles.

Team standings 
 Note: Top 10 only
 Scoring: 6 points for a 1st-place finish in an event, 4 points for 2nd, 3 points for 3rd, 2 points for 4th, and 1 point for 5th
 (DC) = Defending Champions
 Full results

Men's title

Women's title

References

NCAA Indoor Track and Field Championships
Ncaa Indoor Track And Field Championships
Ncaa Indoor Track And Field Championships
NCAA Indoor Track and Field Championships